Ahuntsic was a federal electoral district in Quebec, Canada, that was represented in the House of Commons of Canada from 1968 to 1979 and from 1988 to 2015.

Geography
The district included the neighbourhoods of Ahuntsic and Bordeaux-Cartierville and the western part of the neighbourhood of Sault-au-Recollet in the Borough of Ahuntsic-Cartierville.

Prior to being abolished, its neighbouring ridings were Papineau, Mount Royal, Saint-Laurent—Cartierville, Laval, Alfred-Pellan, Bourassa, and Saint-Léonard—Saint-Michel.

History
The electoral district of Ahuntsic was created in 1966 from Saint-Denis and Laval ridings. In 1976, it was abolished when it was redistributed into  Saint-Michel riding.

In 1987, the new district of Ahuntsic was created from Saint-Michel—Ahuntsic and Saint-Denis.

From 1993 to 2008 Ahuntsic was usually a competitive seat between Bloc Québécois and the Liberals. However, in 2011 Bloc Québécois incumbent Maria Mourani narrowly won reelection against a New Democratic surge that swept through Montreal and Quebec in general. Ahuntsic was the sole seat retained by Bloc Québécois in the Montreal area and one of only four won by the party overall at the 2011 federal election.

Members of Parliament

This riding has elected the following Members of Parliament:

Election results

Ahuntsic, 1988–2015

|-

|-

	
|-

|align="left" colspan=2|Liberal hold
|align="right"|Swing
|align="right"| -9.6
|align="right"|

Note: Conservative vote is compared to the total of the Canadian Alliance vote and Progressive Conservative vote in 2000 election.

Ahuntsic, 1968–1979

Note: Social Credit vote is compared to Ralliement créditiste vote in the 1968 election.

See also
 List of Canadian federal electoral districts
 Past Canadian electoral districts

Notes

References

Riding history 1966-1976 from the Library of Parliament
Riding history 1987-2008 from the Library of Parliament
Elections Canada, 2011 General Election Results, Ahuntsic
Campaign expense data from Elections Canada

Former federal electoral districts of Quebec
Ahuntsic-Cartierville